Khao Kheow Open Zoo ) is a large zoo in Thailand. It covers an area of about 2,000 acres and contains more than 8,000 animals from more than 300 species. The zoo is located in Si Racha, Chonburi Province in eastern Thailand.

History  

The Khao Kheow Open Zoo was established in 1974 with area of about 200 acres in Khao Yai National Park due to the increasing number of animals in the Dusit Zoo. In 1978, the zoo was opened to the public. In 1984, zoological park organisation allowed on expansion the area to about 1000 acres for wildlife conservation in the Khao Yai Mountain area. Princess Sirindhorn also gave tremendous support to rescue injured animals and wildlife in this project. Subsequently, the Thai government decided to expand the area about 800 acres more to support education and research about the environment.

Zones 
The zoo is divided into several thematic zones.

  African Savannah  This section is designed to be habitat and environment like the animal’s natural in Africa habitat. Many animals live in the same area such as Grant's zebras, impalas, springboks, East African oryxes, giraffes, white rhinoceros, and South African ostriches. This zone is two acres in size and visitors can feed many of the animals.
  Khao Kheow Night Safari This zone is for visitors who want to explore and experience the zoo after sunset. After dark, visitors can hear the night time sounds of animals and get the atmosphere of a wild night.
  Cats Complex Park  This park consists of a collection of graceful and nimble wild animals in the cat family. Visitors can observe 48 species of varying size in eight enclosures that cover a total area of 40 acres. Each enclosure area has each species nature habitats, for example, grasslands, desert, lands, woodlands, wetlands, and mountains.
  Walk Through Aviary  Visitors can walk through the aviary area while being surrounded by more than 80 different species of birds. The aviary covers two acres and is decorated with streams, ponds, waterfalls, and many plants. This section is suitable for visitors to enjoy viewing the many birds in a natural atmosphere.
  Eld’s Deer Park  The deer park zone is an area for visitors to sit down and relax. The area is more than an acre in size. While there, visitors can touch the deer, take photographs of them, and feed them.

References

External links 

Zoos in Thailand
Buildings and structures in Chonburi province